Following is a list of teams on the World Curling Tour which participated in the 2011–12 curling season.

Men
As of December 5, 2011

Women
As of January 19, 2012

References
World Curling Tour: Women's teams
World Curling Tour: Men's teams

Teams
2011 in curling
2012 in curling
World Curling Tour teams